John Eldon Smith (September 17, 1930 – December 15, 1983) was convicted of the murders of Ronald and Juanita Akins. He was executed by the state of Georgia via electric chair at the age of 53. He became the first person to be executed in Georgia since 1976 when the death penalty was reinstated.

Background

John Eldon Smith 
According to a biography his attorneys prepared for Georgia's Department of Offender Rehabilitation, Smith grew up in Pennsylvania, working summers on a farm. Eventually he became a volunteer firefighter and joined the Insurance Company of North America as a fire-underwriter trainee. Afterwards, he joined the United States Army, where, after four years of service and being awarded the Good Conduct Medal, was honorably discharged.

Smith's first marriage, to Catherine Fitzgerald, lasted from 1953 to 1963. They remarried and then divorced again in 1975. While married, they had one son.

In 1973, after the dissolution of Smith's marriage, he relocated to New Jersey to be the vice president of an insurance agency. An episode of "deep loneliness" led him to take a vacation in 1974 to North Miami Beach, Florida, where he met Rebecca Turpin.

Rebecca Turpin 
In 1956, shortly after graduating from high school, Rebecca Turpin married Joseph Ronald Akins, a technician and an engineer who worked for Southern Natural Gas. They had three daughters together by 1960. In 1973, Akins accused his wife of trying to murder him, leading to their divorce by the next year. Akins remarried to Juanita Knight, an elementary schoolteacher.

Subsequent to the divorce, Rebecca relocated to North Miami Beach, Florida, with her daughters, where she met John Eldon Smith, an insurance salesman who was also a native of Miami. The two of them were soon married. Subsequently, Smith adopted the moniker 'Anthony Isalldo Machetti' (often shortened to Tony Machetti) because his wife thought the name had a 'mafia' ring to it. Rebecca changed her own name to Rebecca Akins Smith Machetti. Smith and his wife Rebecca had aspirations of living a life of luxury in North Miami Beach, with Smith adopting an identity as a hitman to fund the lifestyle.

When Rebecca realized that her daughters were the beneficiaries to Ronald Akins's life insurance policy, she decided to murder him in order to cash in on it. Rebecca stood to gain $53,000 from Akins's murder.

Murder and trial
On the evening of August 31, 1974, Smith, alongside his wife Rebecca and one of Rebecca's former lovers, another former insurance salesman and a Fort Myers native named John Maree, lured 38-year-old Joseph Ronald Akins to a suburban subdivision under construction in Bibb County, Georgia, in Macon, under the guise of installing a television antenna. Juanita, who was 29 and had only been married to Akins for twenty days, accompanied him. Upon the victims' arrival, Smith and Maree ambushed them while wielding a shotgun and shot Ronald twice and Juanita once while the victims were still in the car, killing them. During the murders, Rebecca remained in Miami and did not accompany Smith and Maree to Macon. The bodies were discovered only hours later by a private pilot who happened to have been flying over the area.

After committing the murders, Smith and Maree returned to North Miami Beach. Maree was promised $1,000 for his involvement in the murder. Shortly afterwards, police suspected that Rebecca was involved in the murders. Rebecca, Smith, and Maree were all arrested in October 1974. All three were extradited to Georgia.

During John Smith's trial, John Maree took the witness stand for the prosecution and testified that he witnessed Smith commit the murders after driving Smith from Miami to Macon. He also testified that the original plan was to beat Ronald Akins and then inject him with poison, but the plan was thwarted by Juanita accompanying her husband, and by the fact that the beating that Maree and Smith had planned failed to render the victims unconscious, leading to the killers resorting to shooting Ronald and Juanita Akins with buckshot from a 12-gauge shotgun. Maree claimed that Rebecca Machetti convinced him and Smith to participate in the murders by telling them that she wanted "vengeance" against Ronald Akins for issues during her marriage to Akins, and Maree also claimed that both Smith and Rebecca threatened him and his family should he refuse to assist with the murders. Smith also took the stand during his trial, testifying in his own defense and denying any knowledge or involvement in the murders. His alibi was that he spent the day of the murders on a beach near his house in Miami, and he claimed that he had loaned Maree his driver's license and credit cards under the supposed guise of Maree going on a business trip with them.

John Eldon Smith was convicted by an all-male jury on two counts of first-degree murder after a three-day trial. During the guilt phase of the trial, the jury only deliberated for 25 minutes before determining that Smith was guilty of the murders of Ronald and Juanita Akins. During the sentencing phase of Smith's trial, his jury deliberated for only 90 minutes before agreeing to sentence Smith to death. Rebecca went on trial on February 10, 1975, and received a death sentence from her jury as well. Maree agreed to testify against Smith and Rebecca in exchange for a guilty plea to two counts of first-degree murder, after which he received two concurrent life sentences that came with the possibility of parole. Maree entered his guilty plea in on April 4, 1975.

Death row and appeals
Smith's death sentence was automatically appealed. At the time of Smith's death sentence, it was customary for an automatic appeal to be filed in every new death row inmate's case, thereby delaying the imposition of death sentences until the appeals process is finished or inmates waive their remaining appeals. In 1976, the Georgia Supreme Court upheld Smith's death sentence.

While Smith was on death row, Rebecca's attorneys appealed her death sentence on the grounds that women were underrepresented in her jury pool. While Smith's jury was picked from the same pool as Rebecca's jury, he did not appeal on those grounds, as his attorneys were unaware of a recent Supreme Court decision that found that the under-representation of women in a jury pool was a violation of the Sixth Amendment to the United States Constitution. Rebecca won a retrial on those grounds, which took place after a change of venue to Gwinnett County, Georgia, and was eventually re-sentenced to life imprisonment. Shortly afterwards, Smith's death sentence was upheld as the same federal court that overturned Rebecca's sentence refused to grant Smith a new trial.

Smith was the first person on Georgia's death row to have an execution date scheduled following the death penalty moratorium that was established with the U.S. Supreme Court's 1972 Furman v. Georgia ruling and lifted by their 1976 Gregg v. Georgia ruling. Because of this distinction, Smith's case garnered significant amounts of press and notoriety. In October 1976, after Smith won a stay of execution, Atlanta's then-mayor, Maynard Jackson, protested the execution. At the time, Jackson was a member of a group called the Georgia Committee Against the Death Penalty, and he and other members of the group called for then-Governor George Busbee to halt all executions during his term of office. When referencing the return of the death penalty nationwide, Jackson stated, "This backward step cannot be tolerated. The death penalty historically has been applied selectively, with primarily the oppressed and the disadvantaged poor people, black and white, uneducated people bearing the brunt of this brutal, barbaric punishment." Jackson was joined by then-State Representative David Scott, the executive director of the Georgia branch of the American Civil Liberties Union Gene Guerrero, and the executive director of the Atlanta branch of the NAACP, Jondell Johnson, in calling for a 90-day stay for John Smith. No executions were carried out during Busbee's term.

Execution and aftermath
The day prior to Smith's execution, the Georgia Pardon and Paroles Board denied his request for clemency. He was also scheduled to be executed alongside Alpha Otis O'Daniel Stephens, another Georgia death row inmate, but the U.S. Supreme Court granted Stephens a last-minute stay of execution by a 5-4 vote, while Smith, who had exhausted all of his court appeals by then, had his request denied by a 7-2 vote. Parole Board Chairman Mobley Howell said of Smith's case, "There can be no doubt John Eldon Smith was a willing and active participant in the crime of murder."

Smith's execution was scheduled to take place on December 15, 1983, at 8:00 a.m., which, according to a former prison guard who was staffed to work at Smith's execution, attracted many anti-death penalty protests and Atlanta-based television stations. Smith was executed by electric chair at the Georgia Diagnostic and Classification State Prison in Jackson, Georgia, thereby becoming the first person to be executed in Georgia since the electrocution of Bernard Dye on October 16, 1964, which occurred prior to the death penalty moratorium established by Furman v. Georgia. The prison announced that Smith's time of death occurred at approximately 8:15 a.m.

Years after his execution, his final words would be purported to have been, "Well, the Lord is going to get another one." In reality, contemporaneous sources state that Smith had no official final words and did not request any specific witnesses to attend his execution, although reporters noted that he told the warden shortly before his execution, "My final statement will be delivered by Father Wise" (referring to then-prison chaplain Reverend Richard Wise) and that he also told guards as they were strapping him into the electric chair, "Hey, there ain't no point in pulling it so tight."

Following Smith's execution, anti-death penalty activist Henry Schwarzschild noted that John Smith's execution ushered in a new era of executions in the United States wherein the death penalty would be applied more frequently: "We have entered a new period where executions are utterly likely."

John Maree was paroled from prison after serving 13 years of his sentence. In 2010, at the age of 71, Rebecca Machetti was paroled 36 years into her sentence and changed her surname to Lorusso to match that of her new common-law husband at the time. In September 2020, at the age of 81, she died of complications related to COVID-19.

See also
 Capital punishment in Georgia (U.S. state)
 Capital punishment in the United States
 List of people executed in Georgia (U.S. state)

References

1930 births
1983 deaths
People from North Miami Beach, Florida
20th-century executions by Georgia (U.S. state)
20th-century executions of American people
American male criminals
American people convicted of murder
People executed by Georgia (U.S. state) by electric chair
People executed for murder
People convicted of murder by Georgia (U.S. state)